The  is a Kofun period burial mound located in the Shiroishi neighborhood of the city of Fujioka, Gunma Prefecture in the northern Kantō region of Japan. It was designated a National Historic Site of Japan in 1993. It is one of several kofun in the Shiroishi Kofun cluster.

Overview
The Shiroishi Inariyama Kofun tumulus is located on hilly terrain 1.5 km south of the confluence of the Aburagawa and Ayugawa rivers at an elevation of 120 meters, and is one of a cluster of kofun tumuli in the area. The first and second tiers were originally covered in fukiishi with rows of cylindrical and cone-shaped haniwa encircled the posterior circular portion of the mound. It is unknown if the tumulus had a moat.

Preliminary investigations were conducted in 1933 and a new archaeological excavation was conducted from 1985 to 1986. In the 1933 excavation, two burial chambers in the posterior circular portion of the tumulus were found and opened and a number of grave goods were recovered, including two unique two stone pillows. Other grave goods included a large number of stone imitations of various everyday items, bronze mirrors, iron weapons, magatama  and round beads were excavated. These items and also haniwa in the shape of houses are now stored at the Tokyo National Museum. A ground penetrating radar survey was performed by the Gunma Prefectural Museum of History and Waseda University from April 2018 to May 2019. The survey found that the tumulus length, which was thought to be 140 meters, was actually 155 meters, and the tumulus was re-dated to at least the beginning of the 5th century AD. In addition, the presence of a third burial chamber within the anterior rectangular portion of the tumulus was found.

Shiroishi Inariyama Kofun
Overall length: 155 meters
Posterior circle: 92 meter diameter x 13.5 meters high  
Anterior rectangular portion: 81 meter width x 8.5 meters high

Junitenzuka Kofun
Overall length: 36.8 meters
Posterior circle: 26.8 meter diameter x 2.6 meters high

Junitenkitazuka Kofun
Overall length: 23 meters
Posterior circle: 22 meter diameter x 2.2 meters high

The tumuli are located about 20 minutes by car from Gunma-Fujioka Station on the JR East Hachikō Line.

See also
List of Historic Sites of Japan (Gunma)

References

External links

Fujioka City official guide 

Kofun
History of Gunma Prefecture
Fujioka, Gunma
Archaeological sites in Japan
Historic Sites of Japan